The 1997 Northwestern Wildcats football team represented Northwestern University during the 1997 Big Ten Conference football season. They played their home games at Ryan Field and participated as members of the Big Ten Conference. They were coached by Gary Barnett.

Schedule

Roster

References

Northwestern
Northwestern Wildcats football seasons
Northwestern Wildcats football